The 2008 Tashkent Open was a women's tennis tournament played on outdoor hard courts. It was the 10th edition of the Tashkent Open, and was part of the Tier IV Series of the 2008 WTA Tour. It took place at the Tashkent Tennis Center in Tashkent, Uzbekistan, from September 29 through October 5, 2008. Third-seeded Sorana Cîrstea won the singles title.

Finals

Singles

 Sorana Cîrstea defeated  Sabine Lisicki, 2–6, 6–4, 7–6(7–4)
It was Sorana Cîrstea's 1st career title.

Doubles

 Ioana Raluca Olaru /  Olga Savchuk defeated  Nina Bratchikova /  Kathrin Wörle, 5–7, 7–5, [10–7]

References

External links
 Official website
 ITF tournament edition details
 Tournament draws

 
Tashkent Open
2008
Tashkent Open